Crassispira luctuosa is a species of sea snail, a marine gastropod mollusc in the family Pseudomelatomidae.

Description
The length of the shell varies between 10 mm and 20 mm..

Distribution
This marine species occurs off Cuba and the Virgin Islands

References

 d'Orbigny, Cat. Cub. Moll. p. 31, no. 370 1847

External links
 

luctuosa
Gastropods described in 1847